Azathoth may refer to:

Azathoth, the Lovecraftian Outer God ruler
Azathoth (short story), the short story in which he first appears
Azathoth (geometry), also known as the great retrosnub icosidodecahedron